The Childrens Choir of Elbosco was the name of a joint Spanish musical group that achieved world success with the song "Nirvana" in 1995.

The group consisted of the boys choral group of the Escolanía del Real Monasterio of San Lorenzo, with boys between 9 and 14 years old along with adult instrumentalists and soloists.  In 1995, the group released the disk Angelis, with the hit song Nirvana which was used by Danny Boyle in the film Millions.  The music, a mixture of Gregorian chants with hip-hop and techno, with a mixture of Latin and English vocals, attained international fame. They also released a Portuguese version of the disk with the same title.
The group mixed classical music, boys chorus and synth generated sounds, resulting in a sound similar to that of Enigma.

In the monastery, 100 boys are selected for their musical talent and presented in white robes.

Since the arrival of Elbosco, several similar groups arose such as Libera, but did not attain the same success as Nirvana.

In 1995, they released their debut album "Angelis".

Discography
Angelis (Hispavox, 1995)
Nirvana (4:54)
A Kind of Birds (4:21)
Nebo (4:46)
Spend a Happy Day (4:42)
Zom (3:48)
Soul Lives Forever (5:03)
Angelis (4:10)
Children of Light (5:28)
Life Is One (4:53)
Egos Quos Amo (4:50)
Opera Verbum (4:22)
Blind Man (4:57)
In Excelsis (5:25)

Virginal (Hispavox, 1997)
Ave Virgo (3:54)
Paradise Girl (4:17)
Echo's Queen (3:33)
Lost Paradise (3:59)
Virginal (4:16)
The City (4:54)
Orbit (3:22)
Fancy Venus (4:25)
Virgin's Dance (4:09)
Vestal Aria (4:25)
Nightingale (4:17)
Purity (3:21)

References

Child musical groups
Spanish musical groups